Callixenus of Rhodes was a Hellenistic author from Rhodes.  He was a contemporary of Ptolemy II Philadelphus, Ptolemy III Euergetes and Ptolemy IV Philopator. He wrote two works, both of which are lost.

Works 
 Peri Alexandreias - A work consisting of four books, and referenced much by Athenaeus  It contained the main account of the Tessarakonteres.
 An untitled catalogue of painters and sculptors (Zografon te kai andriantopoion anagrafe), of which Sopater, in the twelfth book of his Eclogae had made an abridgement.

Sources

References

Bibliography
 

Hellenistic-era historians
3rd-century BC historians
Hellenistic sculpture
Ancient Rhodian historians
3rd-century BC Rhodians